Domino is the debut self-titled studio album by American rapper Domino. It was released on December 7, 1993, through Outburst Records with distribution via Rush Associated Labels/Chaos Recordings. Recording sessions took place at Skip Saylor Recording in Hollywood. Production was primarily handled by DJ Battlecat, as well as AMG and Domino, with Anthony "Anti" Lewis, Greedy Greg and Big Bass Brian Walker served as executive producers. It features guest appearances from AMG and Laquan. The album is now out of print.

The album made it to number 39 on Billboard 200 and number 10 on the Top R&B/Hip-Hop Albums. It was certified gold by the Recording Industry Association of America on March 1, 1994. Its lead single, "Getto Jam", peaked at No. 7 on the Billboard Hot 100, topped the Hot Rap Songs, and went gold on January 5, 1994, for selling 500,000 units in the United States. The second single off of the album, "Sweet Potatoe Pie", reached No. 27 on the Billboard Hot 100 and No. 3 on the Hot Rap Songs.

Track listing

Sample credits
Track 4 contains a sample from "Summer Madness" written by Alton Taylor, Robert Mickens, Ronald Bell, Dennis Thomas, Ricky West, George Brown, Claydes Charles Smith and Robert Bell as recorded by Kool & the Gang
Track 10 contains a sample from "Funky Worm" written by Greg Webster, Marvin Pierce, N. Napier, Andrew Noland, Leroy Bonner, Ralph Middlebrooks, Walter Morrison and Marshall Jones as recorded by the Ohio Players

Personnel
Shawn Antione Ivy – main artist, co-producer (track 2)
AMG – featured artist & producer (track 10)
LaQuan – featured artist (track 10)
Kevin "Battlecat" Gilliam – keyboards & producer (tracks: 1–9), talkbox (track 7), programming & mixing
Robert "Fonksta" Bacon – guitar (tracks: 1, 2, 4, 5, 9), bass (tracks: 1, 2), keyboards (track 3)
Sean Freehill – mixing
Louie Teran – engineering
Wallace "Wally T." Traugott – mastering
Anthony "Anti" Lewis – executive producer
"Big Bass" Brian Walker – executive producer
Greedy Greg – executive producer
The Drawing Board – art direction
Michael Miller – photography

Charts

Certifications

References

External links

G-funk albums
1993 debut albums
Domino (rapper) albums
Albums produced by Battlecat (producer)
Def Jam Recordings albums